The 1974–75 Detroit Red Wings season was the 49th season for the Detroit franchise, 43rd as the Red Wings. The team finished fourth and missed the playoffs

Offseason

Regular season

Final standings

Schedule and results

Playoffs
The Red Wings failed to qualify for the playoffs for the fifth straight year.

Player statistics

Regular season
Scoring

Goaltending

Note: GP = Games played; G = Goals; A = Assists; Pts = Points; +/- = Plus-minus PIM = Penalty minutes; PPG = Power-play goals; SHG = Short-handed goals; GWG = Game-winning goals;
      MIN = Minutes played; W = Wins; L = Losses; T = Ties; GA = Goals against; GAA = Goals-against average;  SO = Shutouts;

Awards and records

Transactions

Roster

Draft picks
Detroit's draft picks at the 1974 NHL amateur draft held in Montreal, Quebec.

Farm teams

See also
1974–75 NHL season

References

External links
 

Detroit Red Wings seasons
Detroit
Detroit
Detroit Red
Detroit Red